The 2022–23 Arkansas Razorbacks women's basketball team represents the University of Arkansas during the 2022–23 NCAA Division I women's basketball season. The Razorbacks, led by sixth-year head coach Mike Neighbors, play their home games at Bud Walton Arena and compete as members of the Southeastern Conference (SEC).

Previous season
The Razorbacks finished the season 18–14 (7–9 SEC) to finish tied for eighth in the conference. They lost in the first round of the NCAA Tournament to Utah, 92–69.

Schedule and results

|-
!colspan=12 style=|Exhibition

|-
!colspan=12 style=|Non-conference regular season

|-
!colspan=12 style=|SEC regular season

|-
!colspan=9 style=| SEC Tournament

|-
!colspan=9 style=| WNIT

Rankings

See also
 2022–23 Arkansas Razorbacks men's basketball team

References

Arkansas Razorbacks women's basketball seasons
Arkansas
Arkansas Razorbacks
Arkansas Razorbacks